Brian Cregan (born 1961) is an Irish judge who currently serves as Judge of the High Court and is the chairperson of the IBRC commission of investigation.

Early career 
Cregan attended Gonzaga College. He attended St John's College, Oxford and the King's Inns. He became a barrister in 1990 and a senior counsel in 2004. His practice focused on competition law and commercial law. He has represented Seán Quinn in the High Court in disputes against Anglo Irish Bank.

Judicial career 
He was appointed to the High Court in April 2014. Cregan presided over cases in the Commercial Court. He has heard cases involving intellectual property law, procurement law, defamation, insolvency law, and consumer law.

He adjudicated a dispute between Rory McIlroy and his management company Horizon Sports Management in 2015. He was responsible for introducing a three strikes policy for Irish internet service provider UPC Ireland for piracy of copyrighted works by its customers.

IBRC Commission 
Cregan was appointed as chairperson of the IBRC commission of investigation in July 2015, replacing Daniel O'Keeffe. The commission's purpose is to investigate the sale of the company Siteserv by the Irish Bank Resolution Corporation to Denis O'Brien. He delivered the sixth interim report of the Commission in June 2019. Taoiseach Leo Varadkar announced that Cregan's reporting timeframe would continue to 31 March 2020. As of December 2018, the commission had considered 102 statements and dealt with over 500,000 pages of documents.

The final extension for the commission to complete its investigation was for June 2020.

His role on the commission is full time, meaning that he has not been available to hear cases in the High Court.

Other work 
In 2013 Cregan published, Parnell: A Novel, a novelised account of the life of Charles Stewart Parnell, which took ten years to research.

References

Living people
High Court judges (Ireland)
1961 births
Irish barristers
Alumni of St John's College, Oxford
Alumni of King's Inns
People educated at Gonzaga College
21st-century Irish novelists